The Devanney Site is an archaeological site in the southwestern part of the U.S. state of Ohio.  Located west of Goshen in Clermont County, it appears to have been occupied periodically for thousands of years.

While it is primarily an Archaic site, the stratification indicates that many later cultures visited the site. Collection of items on the surface of the site has yielded artifacts such as stone tools and rocks blackened by fire.

Few well-preserved Archaic sites have been found in the Ohio River valley, and few of those that have been found are temporary campsites such as Devanney; consequently, it is of great significance in reconstructing the culture of the period.  In recognition of its archaeological value, the Devanney Site was listed on the National Register of Historic Places in 1978.

References

Archaeological sites in Ohio
Archaic period in North America
National Register of Historic Places in Clermont County, Ohio
Archaeological sites on the National Register of Historic Places in Ohio